Chalcosyrphus (Xylotomima) piger (Fabricius, 1794), the short-haired leafwalker, is an uncommon species of syrphid fly found throughout North America and Europe. Hoverflies get their names from the ability to remain nearly motionless while in flight. The adults are also known as flower flies, for they are commonly found around and on flowers, from which they get both energy-giving nectar and protein-rich pollen. Larvae have been identified from sappy hollows from Larix and Pinus.

Distribution

Europe, Canada, United States.(see distribution map)

References

Eristalinae
Insects described in 1794
Diptera of Europe
Diptera of North America
Taxa named by Johan Christian Fabricius